Bahruz Abdurrahman oglu Maharramov (born 22 August 1983) is an Azerbaijani lawyer and politician who is a Member of the National Assembly of Azerbaijan (VI convocation), and Member of the Azerbaijani Bar Association.

Early life and education 
Bahruz Maharramov was born on August 22, 1983, in Agabagy, Zardab District. He received his primary education in Agabagy and Kandabil. Then he moved to Baku where he finished secondary school #194, and also Zangilan high school #24 which was located in the capital after the capture of Zangilan District by Armenian Armed Forces.

In 2004, Maharramov graduated from Baku State University Faculty of Journalism.

From 2004 to 2005, he served in the US Marine Corps in the Republic of Iraq as part of the Azerbaijani peacekeeping forces.

In 2011, he successfully completed his bachelor's degree in law from the same university. In 2015, he successfully defended his doctoral thesis on the topic "The application of the European Court of Human Rights decisions by the national courts". Afterwards Maharramov was awarded PhD in law. In 2018, by the decision of the Higher Attestation Commission under the President, he became an associate professor.

Career 
Since 2012 Maharramov has been doing scientific and pedagogical activity at the law faculty of BSU. He is the author of 3 books, 7 syllabus and more than 30 scientific articles. He is also an associate professor at the UNESCO Department of Human Rights and Information Law at Baku State University.

He has held responsible positions in Azad Azerbaijan TV, International Bank of Azerbaijan, "Avromed company" LLC, Constitutional Court of Azerbaijan and PASHA Insurance.

He is a Member of the National Assembly of Azerbaijan (VI convocation) for Bilasuvar District #66.

References 

1983 births
People from Zardab District
Baku State University alumni
Academic staff of Baku State University
21st-century Azerbaijani lawyers
Members of the National Assembly (Azerbaijan)
Living people